The 2020 European Motocross Championship was the 32nd European Motocross Championship season since it was revived in 1988. It includes 16 events and 6 different classes. It started at Matterley Basin in Great Britain on 1 March, and ends at Imola in Italy on 20 September. All rounds will act as support classes at the European rounds of the 2020 MXGP. In 2020, the EMX Open class will form part of the series for the first time.

EMX250
A 9-round calendar for the 2020 season was announced on 16 October 2019.
EMX250 is for riders competing on 2-stroke and 4-stroke motorcycles between 175cc-250cc.
Only riders under the age of 23 are allowed to compete.

Calendar

Entry list

Riders Championship

Manufacturers Championship

EMX125
A 9-round calendar for the 2020 season was announced on 16 October 2019.
EMX125 is for riders competing on 2-stroke motorcycles of 125cc.

Calendar

Entry list

Riders Championship

Manufacturers Championship

EMX Open
A 6-round calendar for the 2020 season was announced on 16 October 2019.
EMX Open is for riders competing on 2-stroke and 4-stroke motorcycles up to 450cc.

Calendar

Entry list

Riders Championship

Manufacturers Championship

EMX2T
A 3-round calendar for the 2020 season was announced on 16 October 2019.
EMX2T is for riders competing on 2-stroke motorcycles of 250cc.

Calendar

Entry list

Riders Championship

Manufacturers Championship

EMX85
A 1-round calendar for the 2020 season was announced on 16 October 2019.
EMX85 is for riders competing on 2-stroke motorcycles of 85cc. This was later canceled by the FIM in April 2020.

Calendar

EMX65
A 1-round calendar for the 2020 season was announced on 16 October 2019.
EMX65 is for riders competing on 2-stroke motorcycles of 65cc. This was later canceled by the FIM in April 2020.

Calendar

References 

European Motocross Championship
European Motocross
Motocross
Impact of the COVID-19 pandemic on motorsport